Andrei Nikolaevich Lankov (born 26 July 1963) is a Russian scholar of Asia and a specialist in Korean studies and Director of Korea Risk Group, the parent company of NK News and NK Pro.

Early life and education
Lankov was born on 26 July 1963, in Leningrad, Soviet Union (modern day Saint Petersburg). He completed his undergraduate and graduate studies at Leningrad State University in 1986 and 1989, respectively. He also attended Pyongyang's Kim Il-sung University in 1985.

Career
Following his graduate studies, Lankov taught Korean history and language at his alma mater, and in 1992 went to South Korea for work; he moved to Australia in 1996 to take up a post at the Australian National University, and moved back to Seoul to teach at Kookmin University in 2004. Lankov has written in Russian (his native language), Korean, and English. He runs a North Korea-themed Livejournal blog in Russian, where he documents aspects of life in North (and South) Korea, together with his musings and links to his publications. He has written a column for the English-language daily The Korea Times for 15 years and also for Bloomberg News and Al Jazeera English.

Lankov has been a regular contributor to NK News and its premium research platform NK Pro since 2012. In May 2017, he became a Director of Korea Risk Group, the parent company of these platforms and committed to writing exclusively for the firm, outside of his academic commitments.

Books

References

External links

Unofficial, 'fan-made' channel on Telegram

The interview with Lankov (Video) by RT
North Korea's missionary position by Andrei Lankov, Asia Policy
The Natural Death of North Korean Stalinism by Andrei Lankov, Asia Policy (January 2006)
Pyongyang Strikes Back: North Korean Policies of 2002–08 and Attempts to Reverse "De-Stalinization from Below" by Andrei Lankov, Asia Policy (July 2009)
The Death of Juche? A roundtable discussion about the growth of markets in North Korea at Center for Free Enterprise, (28 September 2011)

1963 births
Living people
Academic staff of the Australian National University
Academic staff of Saint Petersburg State University
Saint Petersburg State University alumni
Kim Il-sung University alumni
Koreanists
Russian expatriates in North Korea
Russian expatriates in South Korea
Russian expatriates in Australia
Experts on North Korea
Academic staff of Kookmin University